By-elections for the Ninth Legislative Yuan were held in 2019, two on 27 January and four on 16 March, at Taiwan to elect 6 of the 113 members of the Legislative Yuan for the remaining term until 2020.

Background
The by-election was the result of resignations by Pasuya Yao, Democratic Progressive Party legislator for Taipei 2; Kuomintang legislator Lu Shiow-yen from Taichung 5; Wang Huei-mei, Kuomintang legislator for Changhua County 1; Huang Wei-cher, Democratic Progressive Party legislator for Tainan 2; and Yang Cheng-wu, Kuomintang legislator for Kinmen County.

All but Yao won election to local offices in the 2018 local election.

Confirmation of by-election
On 30 November 2018, the Central Election Commission announced that by-elections for Taipei 2 and Taichung 5 were to be held on 26 January 2019. On 4 December 2018, the CEC moved the date to 27 January 2019, as the previously announced date coincided with the General Scholastic Ability Test. Registration of candidacies for these two seats were open from 10 to 14 December 2018.

By-elections for vacant seats in Changhua County 1, Tainan 2, Kimnen County and New Taipei 3 were scheduled for 16 March 2019.

Candidates by main parties

Taipei City Constituency 2
 called in Taipei councillor Ho Chih-wei to contest the seat 
 called in Taipei councillor Chen Bing-fu to contest the seat.
 candidate Chen Si-yu has announced to contest the seat.

Taichung City Constituency 5
 had seven candidates indicate interest in contesting the by-election. The party nominated ex-legislator  to contest the seat.
 has called in Taichung Transportation Bureau director  to contest the seat.

Changhua County Constituency 1
 has 3 candidates indicated interest in contesting the by-election. Polls were done, KMT has nominated current Yunlin-Chiayi-Tainan Regional Branch Workforce Development Agency director Ko Cheng-fang to contest the seat.
 has called in former Lukang Township mayor Huang Chen-yen to contest the seat.

Tainan City Constituency 2
 has called in Kuo Kuo-wen to contest the seat.
 has called in current Tainan councillor 

Kinmen County Constituency
 has called in former Kinmen County Council speaker 
 candidate  announced her intentions to contest the seat, and was stripped of her KMT membership.

New Taipei City Constituency 3
 called in New Taipei City branch chairman Yu Tian to contest the seat 
 called in KMT Vice Chairman of the Cultural Communication Committee Cheng Shih-wei to contest the seat.

Opinion Polls

Taipei City Constituency 2

Taichung City Constituency 5

Tainan City Constituency 2

New Taipei City Constituency 3

Results

Taipei 2
Voted on 27 January 2019.

Taichung 5
Voted on 27 January 2019.

New Taipei 3
Voted on 16 March 2019.

Changhua 1
Voted on 16 March 2019.

Tainan 2
Voted on 16 March 2019.

Kinmen
Voted on 16 March 2019.

Notes

References

By-elections
By-elections in Taiwan